Hoisington High School is a public high school in Hoisington, Kansas, operated by Hoisington USD 431 school district.  The building was designed and constructed in 1940 in the Art-Deco style by architect Henry W. Brinkman and the school is currently listed on the National Register of Historic Places.

The school offers many extracurricular activities, both athletic and non-athletic. Sports teams compete as the "Fighting Cardinals" and the school colors are red, white and black with yellow as an accent color. As of 2019, the school has won 13 state championships in various sports.

History

Early history
Hoisington High School was designed by the Emporia architecture firm Brinkman & Hagan and was constructed in 1940 through the Public Works Administration. The three-story brick building features Art Deco-style stone ornamentation and carved detailing. The building also includes a 1937 native stone stadium constructed by the Works Projects Administration. The property was listed on the National Register of Historic Places in 2005.

Extracurricular activities

Athletics
The athletic programs offered at Hoisington High School compete within the North Central Activities Association. The school is a member of the Kansas State High School Activities Association. The teams are known as the "Fighting Cardinals" and the school colors are red, white and black with yellow as an accent color. As of 2019, the school has won 13 state championships in various sports.

State championships

See also
 List of high schools in Kansas
 List of unified school districts in Kansas

References

External links
 Hoisington High School website

Public high schools in Kansas
Schools in Barton County, Kansas
1940 establishments in Kansas